"I Promise" is a song from Stacie Orrico's self-titled second album. The third single from the album, it was written by Diane Warren and was released only in Europe, Asia and Australia. The midtempo ballad did not do as well as the first two singles, but gave Orrico her third top 40 hit in the UK.

Track listing
UK: CD 1
 "I Promise" (album version)
 "I Promise" (Chris Cox Radio Edit)

UK: CD 2
 "I Promise" (album version)
 "I Promise" (Chris Cox Radio Edit)
 "I Promise" (Boris & Beck Radio Mix)
 "(What Are You Doing) New Year's Eve?"
 "I Promise" (video and enhanced section)

Official versions
 Main Edit
 Radio Edit
 Karaoke
 Chris Cox Club Mix
 Chris Cox Dub
 Chris Cox Radio Edit
 Chris Cox Radio TV
 Boris & Beck Club Mix
 Boris & Beck Dub Mix
 Boris & Beck Radio Mix
 Blacksmith Soundclash Rub Remix (Featuring Jahzell)

Charts

References

2004 singles
Stacie Orrico songs
Songs written by Diane Warren
2004 songs
ForeFront Records singles
Virgin Records singles
Pop ballads
Contemporary R&B ballads
2000s ballads